Richard Coulter (March 1788April 21, 1852) was a Jacksonian member of the U.S. House of Representatives from Pennsylvania.

Richard Coulter was born in Westmoreland County, Pennsylvania, a son of state commissioner Eli Coulter and Priscilla Small (1766–1826).  Richard attended Jefferson College.  He studied law, was admitted to the bar in 1811, and commenced the practice of his profession in Greensburg, Pennsylvania where he became chief burgess.  He was a member of the Pennsylvania House of Representatives from 1816 to 1820.  He then returned to his law practice.

In 1826 Coulter was elected to the U.S. House of Representatives in the Twentieth Congress and reelected as a Jacksonian to the Twenty-first through Twenty-third Congresses.  He was an unsuccessful candidate for reelection in 1834 to the Twenty-fourth Congress.  He was elected judge of the Supreme Court of Pennsylvania and served from 1846 until his death in 1852 in Greensburg.  Interment was in St. Clair Cemetery.

His namesake nephew Richard Coulter was an American Civil War general in the Union Army.

Sources

 The Political Graveyard
 "From Major General to Major Stockholder", by Jennifer Sopko, Westmoreland History, Summer 2007, page 12.

1788 births
1852 deaths
Justices of the Supreme Court of Pennsylvania
Members of the Pennsylvania House of Representatives
Washington & Jefferson College alumni
Pennsylvania state court judges
Jacksonian members of the United States House of Representatives from Pennsylvania
19th-century American politicians